The Burgos Pointer, also called the Burgalese Pointer, is a breed of dog native to Spain. Originating from Castile, especially in the province of Burgos, this hardy breed is used for hunting and has some outstanding features for small game.

History and origin of the breed
The breed dates back to the 16th century and originates in the Castilian plateau, which is very widespread. It is very probable that the breed participated in the creation of other races of this group.

The breed is believed to have descended from a mix of the Sabueso Español and the Pachón Navarro (also known as the Perros de Punta Ibericos).

Description

The figure of the Burgos Pointer is perhaps not so style crystallized as other breeds in their group (such as the English Pointer), but conveys a clear sense of robustness thanks to its port square. Things to note are their long ears and two folded sheets in the form of double chin. The tail is usually cut off a third of its original length.

Colour: It has two color variations: one where the basic color is stained and/or combined with other brown and brown, where the basic color is brown which is, in this case, white spotted.

Coat: The fur is short, bushy and smooth.

Weight:  .

Care

If kept in its natural environment, care is rarely needed given its perfect adaptation to the environment. Like so many other breeds of hunting dogs, they require daily exercise and large doses of wide open spaces where they run.

Temperament

It is a gentle, quiet dog, and is rarely startled. It does not do well in urban environments.

Training

It is intelligent and learns easily it comes to hunting.

Utility

Like many other breeds of this group, this is a dog hunter, used exclusively in countryside environments. It's used for both hunting hare (rabbits, hares, etc.). and feather (birds). It is perfect for hunting in any terrain (hard as it is) as it has excellent physical endurance and speed.

See also
 Dogs portal
 List of dog breeds

References

FCI breeds
Gundogs
Pointers
Rare dog breeds
Dog breeds originating in Castile and León